The Union of the Ukrainians of Romania (UUR; , SUR) is an ethnic minority political party in Romania representing the Ukrainian community.

History 

The UUR contested the 1990 general elections, and despite receiving only 16,179 votes (0.12%), it won a single seat in the Chamber of Deputies under the electoral law that allows for political parties representing ethnic minority groups to be exempt from the electoral threshold. It has won a seat in every election since.

Electoral history

References

External links 

 Official website

Non-registered political parties in Romania
Political parties of minorities in Romania
Ukrainian diaspora in Romania